Kotekara is a census town in Dakshina Kannada district in the Indian state of Karnataka.Kotekar is located on NH-17 south of Mangalore towards Talapady.

Demographics
 India census, Kotekara had a population of 14,323. Males constitute 48% of the population and females 52%. Kotekara has an average literacy rate of 80%, higher than the national average of 59.5%: male literacy is 85%, and female literacy is 76%. In Kotekara, 10% of the population is under 6 years of age.

References

Cities and towns in Dakshina Kannada district